Włodzimierz of Cracow (c. 1191 - 18 March 1241) was a Polish knight, Gryf, and voivode of Kraków (Seniorate Province) from 1237 until his death at the Battle of Chmielnik.

Life and Mongol invasion 
Włodzimierz was a descendant of Piotr Włostowic and a member of the House of Duninowie.

Włodzimierz, as voivode of Kraków, led Cracovian forces of the ziemia at the Battle of Tursko in February 1241 against the Mongol invasion forces. The battle ended in a defeat for the Poles.

A month later, Włodzimierz co-commanded Polish forces alongside the voivode of Sandomierz. They were both slain in the Battle of Chmielnik. His nephew Klement of Ruszcza, succeeded him as Voiovde of Kraków. Following the Polish defeat and his death in battle, Mongol forces sacked the undefended city of Kraków.

In April, his brother Sulisław of Cracow was killed at the Battle of Legnica while commanding forces from Lesser Poland.

Literature 

 A. Małecki, Studya heraldyczne, t. II, Lwów 1890, s. 51-55.
 L. M. Wójcik, Ród Gryfitów do końca XIII wieku. Pochodzenie — genealogia — rozsiedlenie, "Historia" CVII, Wrocław 1993, s. 58–60.

References 

History of Kraków
1241 deaths
13th-century Polish nobility
13th-century births